Miaenia meridiana is a species of beetle in the family Cerambycidae. It was described by Ohbayashi in 1941.

References

Miaenia
Beetles described in 1941